Asher Mizrahi (1890 – 27 October 1967) was a Jewish Tunisian tenor singer and musician, who eventually settled in Israel.

He initially went to Malta, then to Tunisia in 1911 and settled there for over fifty years. In the late 1940s, he ended his active career. He left Tunis after the Six-Day War in 1967, and settled in Israel. He died three months after moving to Israel.

Mizrahi is also known for singing the songs "Habibi Yah Habibi" and "Nagilah Haleluyah".

Titles
 Tesfar we tghib
 Ya hasra kif kont sghira
 Yechoui dammek
 Ya nas hmelt
 Men sabek Bourdgana
 Habbitek we habbitni

References

Israeli Jews
Jews in Ottoman Palestine
Tunisian Jews
20th-century Tunisian male singers
Emigrants from the Ottoman Empire to Tunisia
1890 births
1967 deaths
Tunisian emigrants to Israel
Musicians from Jerusalem